Kai Alexander (born 7 June 1997) is a British actor known for playing Jeffrey in Catastrophe, Richard Branson in Danny Boyle's Pistol and Dante Gunnarsson in Netflix's The Stranger. He most recently joined the cast of upcoming Apple TV+ miniseries Masters of the Air.

Early life and education 
He attended the Arts Educational Schools in London.

Career 
In 2015, he was cast as the lead in the BBC Original Drama Short, Oakwood. In 2016, he joined the cast of Channel 4 and Amazon comedy Catastrophe in a recurring role playing Jeffrey, the on-screen child of characters portrayed by Ashley Jensen and Mark Bonnar. He first appeared in season three, and reprised his role in the fourth and final season which was released in 2019.

In March 2019 he began shooting The Stranger, a Netflix adaptation of the novel by Harlan Coben. It was released on 30 January 2020. 

In 2021, he joined the cast of upcoming Apple TV+ miniseries, Masters of the Air from Steven Spielberg and Tom Hanks.

In 2022, he portrayed Richard Branson, in the Danny Boyle miniseries, Pistol.

Filmography

Film

Television

References

External links 

Living people
21st-century British male actors
People educated at the Arts Educational Schools
British male film actors
British male television actors
1997 births